Moa Glacier is a valley glacier between Marr Glacier and Goldman Glacier in the Kukri Hills of Victoria Land, Antarctica. It flows north into Taylor Valley but terminates midway down the south wall of the valley. The glacier was named by the New Zealand Geographic Board in 1998 after the moa, an extinct New Zealand bird.

References

Glaciers of Victoria Land
McMurdo Dry Valleys